Neritonaclia is a genus of moths in the subfamily Arctiinae. It contains the single species Neritonaclia argenteogutta, which is found in Guyana.

References

Natural History Museum Lepidoptera generic names catalog

Arctiinae